Karabo Dhlamini (born 18 September 2001) is a South African soccer player who plays as a defender for Mamelodi Sundowns FC and the South Africa women's national team. Since 2021 she has been a student at Oakland University, representing Oakland Golden Grizzlies women's soccer on a scholarship.

International career
Dhlamini represented South Africa at the 2018 FIFA U-17 Women's World Cup where she was named as captain of the team. She made her senior debut on 19 January 2019 in a 1–2 friendly loss to the Netherlands at the age of 17 before going on to be called as the youngest member of South Africa's squad for the 2019 FIFA Women's World Cup.

At the 2020 COSAFA Women's Championship, Dhlamini earned her first medal with the senior national team as South Africa emerged as champions. She made four appearances during the tournament, starting throughout the knockout rounds. It was during the competition that Dhlamini scored her first senior international goal during a 2-0 win over Angola.

In July 2022, Dhlamini was a member of the South Africa squad which emerged victorious at the 2022 Africa Women's Cup of Nations and made five appearances at the competition.

References

2001 births
Living people
South African women's soccer players
South Africa women's international soccer players
Women's association football midfielders
2019 FIFA Women's World Cup players